Aliabad-e Basab (also Romanized as ‘Alīābād-e Basāb; also known as ‘Alīābād) is a village in Sabzdasht Rural District, in the Central District of Bafq County, Yazd Province, Iran. At the 2006 census, its population was 44, in 21 families.

References 

Populated places in Bafq County